The Seal Islands are a group of 12/+ islands in the Bering Sea, trending northeast , close to the shores of Bristol Bay, Alaska,  southwest of Port Heiden, Alaska Airfield; Bristol Bay Low.

Etymology 
The Seal Islands appear as "Ostrova Nerpichoi," meaning "Seal Islands" on Russian maps. They were given their name by Captain Mikhail Dmitrievich Tebenkov, who charted the Northwest Coasts of America (1852, map 24), IRN. They appeared for the first time as "Seal Islands" on an USBF chart in 1888.

References

Further reading
Captain Mikhail Dmitrievich Tebenkov

Islands of Aleutians East Borough, Alaska
Islands of the Bering Sea
Islands of Alaska